Lowell Airport  is a privately owned, public use airport located five nautical miles (9 km) southwest of the central business district of Lowell, a town in Lake County, Indiana, United States.

Facilities and aircraft 
Lowell Airport covers an area of 19 acres (8 ha) at an elevation of 675 feet (206 m) above mean sea level. It has one runway designated 18/36 with a turf surface measuring 3,041 by 100 feet (927 x 30 m).

For the 12-month period ending December 31, 2008, the airport had 4,176 general aviation aircraft operations, an average of 11 per day. At that time there were 11 single-engine aircraft based at this airport.

See also 
 List of airports in Indiana

References

External links 
 Aerial image as of April 1998 from USGS The National Map
 
 

Airports in Lake County, Indiana
1980 establishments in Indiana
Airports established in 1980